Waincophis is a genus of prehistoric snake known from Paleocene and Eocene deposits of what is now Brazil and Argentina. Three species have been described.

References

Boidae
Paleocene reptiles of South America
Eocene reptiles of South America
Prehistoric snakes
Prehistoric reptile genera
Golfo San Jorge Basin
Paleogene Argentina